HMS K1 was a First World War steam turbine-propelled K-class submarine of the Royal Navy. She had been patrolling on the surface as part of a flotilla of submarines operating in line ahead. The crew survived and taken off by two cutters sent from HMS Blonde. The collision occurred at approx 17:35 and after consultation with the rescued submariner officers and concluding that the K1 could not be saved, Blonde opened fire with one of her 4 inch guns and sank the submarine with a few shells at 19:10 hours.

Design
K1 displaced  when at the surface and  while submerged. The submarine was powered by two oil-fired Yarrow Shipbuilders boilers each supplying one geared Brown-Curtis or Parsons steam turbine; this developed 10,500 ship horsepower (7,800 kW) to drive two  screws. Submerged power came from four electric motors each producing . It was also had an  diesel engine to be used when steam was being raised, or instead of raising steam.

K1 was armed with ten  torpedo tubes, two  deck guns, and a  anti-aircraft gun. Its torpedo tubes were four in the bows, four in the midship section firing to the sides, and two were mounted on the deck in rotating mountings. Its complement was fifty-nine crew members.

References

External links
'Submarine losses 1904 to present day' - Royal Navy Submarine Museum

 

British K-class submarines
British submarine accidents
World War I shipwrecks in the North Sea
1916 ships
Maritime incidents in 1917
Submarines sunk in collisions
Ships built in Portsmouth
Royal Navy ship names
Scuttled vessels of the United Kingdom
Submarines sunk by submarines